Bratislav is a Slavic origin given name meaning: "brat" - relative, brother and "slava" - glory, fame. Feminine form is Bratislava. The name may refer to:

Bratislav Mijalković, Serbian former football player
Bratislav Punoševac, Serbian footballer
Bratislav Ristić, Serbian football midfielder
Bratislav Živković, Serbian former football midfielder

See also
 Bretislav, a masculine given name
 Bratislava, the capital of Slovakia
 Wrocław, a city in Poland
 Bratslav, an urban-type settlement in Ukraine

External links
http://www.behindthename.com/name/bratislav

Slavic masculine given names
Serbian masculine given names